EFIC may refer to:

 European Federation of IASP Chapters
 Export Finance and Insurance Corporation
 École Française Internationale de Canton (Guangzhou, China)
 École Française Internationale de Colombo